The Sherburne Complex is a joint land management venture of the U.S. Fish and Wildlife Service, the Louisiana Department of Wildlife and Fisheries (LDWF), and the U.S. Army Corps of Engineers that began in 1983. The bridge crosses the Whiskey Bay Pilot Channel. Located on the graveled LA 975, the west boundary is on the east side of the Atchafalaya River with the east boundary being the East Protection Levee. The complex stretches just north of old highway 190, and a short distance to the south of I-10. The nearest town is Krotz Springs to the north off US 190.

History
The Atchafalaya Basin is in the Lower Mississippi River area of the Mississippi River Delta. The culmination of events that eventually led to the existence of wildlife management areas in the Basin in general and the Shereburne Complex in particular began after the Great Flood of 1844 and 1851. The Great Flood of 1927 prompted the Louisiana Legislature to pass several flood control bills, including the Flood Control Act of 1928, as well as Mississippi River & Tributaries (MR&T) Project. The result was the Atchafalaya Basin Floodway system, channelization (Whiskey Bay cutoff), and bank stabilization projects. During the 1930s and 1940s extensive dredging was performed on the Atchafalaya. In 1954, after the Great Flood of 1951, major dredging was resumed by the Corps. In 1963 the Old River control structure was built to prevent the capture of the Mississippi by the Atchafalaya. In 1968, because of environmental concerns as well as a lack of funds, dredging was discontinued. In 1972 the Louisiana Congress enacted act 365 that established the Atchfalaya Basin Division, within the Department of Public Works. The Corps was directed to develop a plan for the Atchafalaya Basin which was completed in 1982 and became the "Atchafalaya Basin Floodway System Project" (ABFS). In 1983,  were purchased by the state for the creation of the Sherburne Wildlife Management Area. In 1985, Louisiana Public Law 99-88 was enacted to authorize a multipurpose plan.

State authorization
In 1986, the United States Congress approved $250,000.000 towards the creation of the Atchafalaya Basin Program and Louisiana Public Law 99-662, section 906, stated the plan to be of National interests.  Governor Foster appointed the Louisiana Department of Natural Resources to work with the Corps of Engineers to produce the "Atchafalaya Basin Master Plan" for the development of the basin. In 1988 a plan was implemented and the current alliance was formed (Section 4.41-B of the Master Plan) creating the Sherburne Complex.

Sherburne Complex

The Sherburne Complex combines the Sherburne Wildlife Management Area (WMA), Atchafalaya National Wildlife Refuge, and the U.S. Army Corps of Engineers' Bayou Des Ourses (Bayou of the Bears), with the intent of conservation and management of all fish and wildlife within the boundaries of the complex. The entire area is classified as "bottomland hardwoods". The area contains swamps, overflow lakes, and many bayous. This provides opportunities for scientific research, environmental education, and fish- and wildlife-oriented recreation. The three combined areas offer ATV trails, two campgrounds, a shooting range and boat launches. There is also a  marked paddling trail that lets visitors tour the bayou without a guide. Recreations also includes birding and nature watching, hunting, fishing, trapping, camping, and nature photography, all complemented by all-weather roads.

Sherburne WMA
 are owned by The Louisiana Department of Wildlife and Fisheries. The office is the site of the Sherburne ghost town, which was a logging town from the 1880s to the 1930s, and ceased to exist after the timber was exhausted.

Atchafalaya National Wildlife Refuge
Atchafalaya is a Choctaw Native American word: hacha for river and falaia for long, or "long river". All persons older than 16 or younger than 60 using wildlife management areas in the state of Louisiana, including the refuge, for any reason other than just traveling LA 975 must purchase a Wild Louisiana Stamp, hunting, or fishing license, or pay a daily charge of $2.00.

Bayou Des Ourses
The area also includes the South Farm Unit.

Atchafalaya Basin
The combined area of the Sherburne Complex is part of the Atchafalaya Basin, the nation's largest river  swamp, containing almost one million acres (4,000 km²). The basin begins near Simmesport  and stretches some  southward to the Gulf of   Mexico. Currently, the Atchafalaya  Basin is bound by natural ridges formed by levee building along active and abandoned courses of the Mississippi River. Around 60 species of reptiles and amphibians, along with over 250 species of birds, including the American bald eagle and the peregrine falcon, can be found in this  productive region. Many types of animal life and nearly 100 different species of fish and aquatic life can also be found in the basin.

Oil and gas
There are extensive gas pipe lines with names such as Gulf Central Pipeline, Dixie Pipeline, Dow Pipeline, Gas Gathering Pipeline, as well as Oil wells located in the area.

Controversy
Since 2001 and the controversy over road tree right-of-way clear cutting for oil wells, many agencies and organizations give input, oversight, and management assistance to the Louisiana Department of Wildlife and Fisheries concerning the protection and future of the complex. Right of way clearings for a new road to allow access to oil wells allowed cutting of kite nesting trees at the height of Neotropical migrant breeding season. The results, including a meeting at the Sherburne WMA headquarters August 14, 2001, resulted in many changes in the policies of the complex including that there will be no further implementation of forestry prescriptions during the breeding season. The Louisiana Natural Heritage Program, within the LDWF, is part of the Nature Conservancy, along with other organizations, with the responsibility of ensuring that the protection of the natural integrity of the complex is maintain within all aspects of planning and implementation of future decisions.

See also
List of National Wildlife Refuges: Louisiana
Interstate 10 in Louisiana
List of Louisiana Wildlife Management Areas

Great Floods
Great Flood of 1844
Flood of 1851
Great Flood of 1951
Great Flood of 1993

References

External links
Sherburne Complex Wildlife Management Area - Louisiana Department of Wildlife and Fisheries
Atchafalaya National Wildlife Refuge - US Fish & Wildlife Service

National Park Service areas in Louisiana
National Wildlife Refuges in Louisiana
IUCN Category V
Wildlife management areas of the United States
Wildlife management areas of Louisiana
Protected areas of Iberville Parish, Louisiana
Protected areas of St. Martin Parish, Louisiana
Swamps of Louisiana
Protected areas established in 1986
Floods in the United States
Flood control in the United States
1844 natural disasters in the United States
1851 natural disasters in the United States
1951 natural disasters in the United States
1893 natural disasters in the United States
Environmental organizations based in the United States
Nature conservation organizations based in the United States
Nature Conservancy preserves
Organizations established in 1996
Nature reserves in Louisiana
1986 establishments in Louisiana